Tomasz Bednarek and Adil Shamasdin were the defending champions, but did not participate.

James Cerretani and Antal van der Duim claimed the title, defeating Wesley Koolhof and Matwé Middelkoop in the final by a score of 6–1, 6–3.

Seeds

Draw

References
 Main Draw

Open de Guadeloupe - Doubles